The Chronicle of Dalimil is the first chronicle written in the Old Czech language. It was composed in verse by an unknown author at the beginning of the 14th century. The Chronicle compiles information from older Czech chronicles written in Latin and also the author's own experiences. The chronicle finishes before 1314, but it is usually published including the entries of later authors describing events up to 1319.

The Chronicle alleged that in the Serbian/Sorbian language there is a land, known as Croatia, and in this country there was a chieftain whose name was Čech. 

The validity of the events are nowadays rejected by some western historians as purely mythological folklore, an archetypal origin myth. The events in the chronicle seem to simply reinterpret the myth of Lech, Czech, and Rus that is repeated in various forms in many other historical records and national chronicles, like Primary Chronicle.

The Dalimil was translated three times into Middle High German (including the recently identified translation by Merbort), and once into Latin.

References

External links
1920 version

West Slavic chronicles
Czech literature
14th-century history books
National Cultural Monuments of the Czech Republic